Grassy Pond is a small lake north-northwest of Little Rapids in Herkimer County, New York. It drains southwest via an unnamed creek which flows into Oven Lake.

See also
 List of lakes in New York

References 

Lakes of New York (state)
Lakes of Herkimer County, New York